The Vanetten House is a historic house at 1012 Cumberland Street in Little Rock, Arkansas.  It is a two-story wood frame American Foursquare house, with a dormered hip roof, weatherboard siding, and brick foundation.  The roof and dormers have extended eaves with exposed rafters, and a single-story porch wraps across the front and around one side, supported by Ionic columns.  Built about 1900, it was designed by Arkansas architect Charles L. Thompson, and is one of his more elaborate Foursquare designs.

The house was listed on the National Register of Historic Places in 1982.

See also
National Register of Historic Places listings in Little Rock, Arkansas

References

Houses on the National Register of Historic Places in Arkansas
Colonial Revival architecture in Arkansas
Houses completed in 1900
Houses in Little Rock, Arkansas